Leandro da Cunha (born October 13, 1980) is a male judoka from Brazil. He won the gold medal in the Half-lightweight (<66 kg) division at the 2011 Pan American Games in Guadalajara, Mexico and the silver medal in the World Judo Championships twice (2010 and 2011).

References
 2012 Olympics Athletes profile

External links
 
 

Judoka at the 2011 Pan American Games
Judoka at the 2012 Summer Olympics
Olympic judoka of Brazil
Living people
1980 births
Brazilian male judoka
Pan American Games gold medalists for Brazil
Pan American Games medalists in judo
Medalists at the 2011 Pan American Games
21st-century Brazilian people
20th-century Brazilian people